Rise is the debut studio album by American singer Samantha James under the label Om Records. 
The title track from the album was released as a single, and reached No. 1 on the US Billboard Hot Dance Club Songs chart.

Background
When James established her music style, she began writing songs for Rise together with Sebastian Arocha Morton. James and friend Dave Curtin discussed which label would be good for her music, and came up with Om Records.  When they contacted the label and sent them a demo of her song "Rise," she was signed on to a single deal. Shortly after that, they signed on "Angel Love" as well.

After that, she was signed to do a full length album. James said in an interview that her biggest inspiration was her mother, who died when James was 13 years old. The album was a two year process.

Track listing

1 Japanese bonus track.

References 

2007 debut albums
Nu jazz albums
Samantha James albums
Albums produced by Sebastian Arocha Morton